Nghi Xuân is a rural district of Hà Tĩnh province in the North Central Coast region of Vietnam. As of 2003 the district had a population of 99,288. The district covers an area of 220 km2. The district seat is the town of Nghi Xuân. Nguyễn Du and Nguyễn Công Trứ, both accomplished writers, were born here.

References

Districts of Hà Tĩnh province